Agastya is a monotypic moth genus of the family Crambidae described by Frederic Moore in 1881. It contains only one species, Agastya hyblaeoides, described by the same author in the same year, which is found in Sikkim, India.

References

Evergestinae
Moths of Asia
Moths described in 1881